The RIM-161 Standard Missile 3 (SM-3) is a ship-based surface-to-air missile system used by the United States Navy to intercept short- and intermediate-range ballistic missiles as a part of Aegis Ballistic Missile Defense System. Although primarily designed as an anti-ballistic missile, the SM-3 has also been employed in an anti-satellite capacity against a satellite at the lower end of low Earth orbit. The SM-3 is primarily used and tested by the United States Navy and also operated by the Japan Maritime Self-Defense Force.

Motivation and development
The SM-3 evolved from the proven SM-2 Block IV design. The SM-3 uses the same solid rocket booster and dual thrust rocket motor as the Block IV missile for the first and second stages and the same steering control section and midcourse missile guidance for maneuvering in the atmosphere. To support the extended range of an exo-atmospheric intercept, additional missile thrust is provided in a new third stage for the SM-3 missile, containing a dual pulse rocket motor for the early exo-atmospheric phase of flight.

Initial work was done to adapt SM-3 for land deployment ("Aegis ashore") to especially accommodate the Israelis, but they then chose to pursue their own system, the NATO code-name Arrow 3. A group in the Obama administration envisioned a European Phased Adaptive Approach (EPAA) and SM-3 was chosen as the main vector of this effort because the competing U.S. THAAD does not have enough range and would have required too many sites in Europe to provide adequate coverage. A significant improvement in this respect, the SM-3 Block II variant widens the missile's diameter from 0.34 m (13.5 in) to 0.53 m (21 in), making it more suitable against intermediate-range ballistic missiles.

The highly modified Block IIA missile shares only the first-stage motor with the Block I. The Block IIA was "designed to allow for Japan to protect against a North Korean attack with fewer deployed ships" but it is also the key element of the EPAA phase 3 deployment in Europe. The Block IIA is being jointly developed by Raytheon and Mitsubishi Heavy Industries; the latter manages "the third-stage rocket motor and nose cone". The U.S. budgeted cost to date is $1.51 billion for the Block IIA.

Operation and performance
The ship's AN/SPY-1 radar finds the ballistic missile target and the Aegis weapon system calculates a solution on the target. When the missile is ordered to launch, the Aerojet MK 72 solid-fuel rocket booster launches the SM-3 out of the ship's Mark 41 vertical launching system (VLS). The missile then establishes communication with the launching ship. Once the booster burns out, it detaches, and the Aerojet MK 104 solid-fuel dual thrust rocket motor (DTRM) takes over propulsion through the atmosphere. The missile continues to receive mid-course guidance information from the launching ship and is aided by GPS data. The ATK MK 136 solid-fueled third-stage rocket motor (TSRM) fires after the second stage burns out, and it takes the missile above the atmosphere (if needed). The TSRM is pulse fired and provides propulsion for the SM-3 until 30 seconds to intercept.

At that point the third stage separates, and the Lightweight Exo-Atmospheric Projectile (LEAP) kinetic warhead (KW) begins to search for the target using pointing data from the launching ship. The Aerojet throttleable divert and attitude control system (TDACS) allows the kinetic warhead to maneuver in the final phase of the engagement. The KW's sensors identify the target, attempt to identify the most lethal part of the target and steers the KW to that point. If the KW intercepts the target, it provides  of kinetic energy at the point of impact.

Independent studies by some physics experts have raised some significant questions about the missile's success rate in hitting targets. In a published response, the Defense Department claimed that these findings were invalid, as the analysts used some early launches as their data, when those launches were not significant to the overall program. The DoD stated:

... the first tests [used] prototype interceptors; expensive mock warheads weren't used in the tests since specific lethality capability wasn't a test objective—the objective was to hit the target missile. Contrary to the assertions of Postol and Lewis, all three tests resulted in successful target hits with the unitary ballistic missile target destroyed. This provided empirical evidence that ballistic missile intercepts could in fact be accomplished at sea using interceptors launched from Aegis ships.

After successful completion of these early developmental tests, the test program progressed from just "hitting the target" to one of determining lethality and proving the operationally configured Aegis SM-3 Block I and SM-3 Block 1A system. These tests were the MDA's most comprehensive and realistic test series, resulting in the Operational Test and Evaluation Force's October 2008 evaluation report stating that Aegis Ballistic Missile Defense Block 04 3.6 System was operationally effective and suitable for transition to the Navy.

Since 2002, a total of 19 SM-3 missiles have been fired in 16 different test events resulting in 16 intercepts against threat-representative full-size and more challenging subscale unitary and full-size targets with separating warheads. In addition, a modified Aegis BMD/SM-3 system successfully destroyed a malfunctioning U.S. satellite by hitting the satellite in the right spot to negate the hazardous fuel tank at the highest closure rate of any ballistic missile defense technology ever attempted.

The authors of the SM-3 study cited only tests involving unitary targets, and chose not to cite the five successful intercepts in six attempts against separating targets, which, because of their increased speed and small size, pose a much more challenging target for the SM-3 than a much larger unitary target missile. They also did not mention the fact the system is successfully intercepting targets much smaller than probable threat missiles on a routine basis, and have attained test scores that many other Defense Department programs aspire to attain.

In an October 25, 2012 test, a SM-3 Block IA failed to intercept a SRBM. In May 2013 however a SM-3 Block IB was successful against a "complex, separating short-range ballistic missile target with a sophisticated separating mock warhead", making it "the third straight successful test of Raytheon's SM-3 Block IB, after a target was missed on its first intercept attempt in September 2011."

On 4 October 2013, an SM-3 Block IB eliminated the medium-range ballistic missile target at the highest altitude of any test to date. The test was the 26th successful intercept for the SM-3 program and the fifth back-to-back successful test of the SM-3 Block IB missile. Post-mission data showed that the intercept was slightly lower than anticipated, but the systems adjusted to ensure the missile intercepted the target. The SM-3 Block IB is expected to be delivered for service in 2015.

On 6 June 2015, an SM-3 Block IIA was successfully tested. The test evaluated the performance of the missile's nosecone, steering control, and the separation of its booster, and second and third stages. No intercept was planned, and no target missile was launched. In October 2016, Russian officials claimed research simulations of U.S. ballistic missile defense systems showed the SM-3 Block IIA was capable of intercepting missiles not only at the middle stage of their flight path, but earlier in the initial acceleration stage before the separation of their warheads.

On 3 February 2017, USS John Paul Jones, using its onboard Aegis Missile Defense System and a Standard Missile-3 Block IIA interceptor, destroyed a medium-range ballistic missile.

On 21 June 2017, the second test of USS John Paul Jones, using its onboard Aegis Missile Defense System and launching a Standard Missile-3 Block IIA interceptor, did not intercept its target, after a sailor, acting as tactical datalink controller, mistakenly designated that target as friendly, which caused the SM-3 interceptor to self-destruct, as designed.

On 31 January 2018, an SM-3 Block IIA missile interceptor launched from a test site in Hawaii missed its target.
On 26 October 2018, USS John Paul Jones detected and tracked a medium-range ballistic missile target with its Aegis Missile Defense System, launched an SM-3 Block IIA interceptor, and destroyed its target, which was launched from the Pacific Missile Range Facility at Kauai, Hawaii.

On 16 November 2020, an SM-3 Block IIA successfully intercepted a simulated intercontinental ballistic missile (ICBM) target for the first time; the test was congressionally mandated and originally scheduled for May 2020 but was delayed due to COVID-19 restrictions. An ICBM-T2 threat-representative target was launched from the Ronald Reagan Ballistic Missile Defense Test Site on Kwajalein Atoll toward the ocean area northeast of Hawaii. The  used off-board sensors through the Command and Control Battle Management Communications (C2BMC) network to track it and then launch an interceptor to destroy the threat. The test demonstrated the SM-3's ability to counter ICBMs and, because of the Aegis radar's limited detection and tracking range relative to the interceptor, showed how the C2BMC network can increase the area that could be defended using engage-on-remote capabilities.

Variants

The SM-3 block IA version provides an incremental upgrade to improve reliability and maintainability at a reduced cost.

The SM-3 block IB, due in 2010, offers upgrades which include an advanced two-color infrared seeker, and a 10-thruster solid throttling divert and attitude control system (TDACS/SDACS) on the kill vehicle to give it improved capability against maneuvering ballistic missiles or warheads. Solid TDACS is a joint Raytheon/Aerojet project, but Boeing supplies some components of the kinetic warhead. With block IB and associated ship-based upgrades, the Navy gains the ability to defend against medium range missiles and some Intermediate Range Ballistic Missiles.

It will still fit in Mk41 vertical launch systems, and the missile will be faster and have longer range.

The SM-3 block IIA is a joint Raytheon/Mitsubishi Heavy Industries project, block IIA will add a larger diameter kill vehicle that is more maneuverable, and carries another sensor/ discrimination upgrade. It was scheduled to debut around 2015, whereupon the Navy will have a weapon that can engage some intercontinental ballistic missiles.

Table sources, reference material:

A further SM-3 block IIB was "conceived for fielding in Europe around 2022". In March 2013, Defense Secretary Chuck Hagel announced that the development program of the SM-3 block IIB, also known as the "next generation AEGIS missile" (NGAM), was undergoing restructuring. Under Secretary James N. Miller was quoted saying that "We no longer intend to add them [SM-3 block IIB] to the mix, but we'll continue to have the same number of deployed interceptors in Poland that will provide coverage for all of NATO in Europe", explaining that Poland is scheduled instead for the deployment of "about 24 SM-3 IIA interceptors – same timeline, same footprint of U.S. forces to support that." A US defense official was quoted saying that "The SM3 IIB phase four interceptors that we are now not going to pursue never existed other than on Power Points; it was a design objective." Daniel Nexon connected the backpedaling of the administration on the block IIB development with pre-election promises made by Obama to Dmitry Medvedev. Pentagon spokesman George E. Little denied however that Russian objections played any part in the decision.

Operational history

United States

Missile defense
In September 2009, President Obama announced plans to scrap plans for missile defense sites in East Europe, in favor of missile defense systems located on US Navy warships. On 18 September 2009, Russian Prime Minister Putin welcomed Obama's plans for missile defense which may include stationing American Aegis armed warships in the Black Sea. This deployment began to occur that same month, with the deployment of Aegis-equipped warships with the RIM-161 SM-3 missile system, which complements the Patriot systems already deployed by American units.

In February 2013, a SM-3 intercepted a test IRBM target using tracking data from a satellite for the first time. On 23 April 2014, Raytheon announced that the U.S. Navy and the Missile Defense Agency had started to deploy the SM-3 Block 1B missile operationally. The deployment starts the second phase of the Phased Adaptive Approach (PAA) adopted in 2009 to protect Europe from Iranian ballistic missile threats. In the Far East the US Navy and Japan plan to deploy increased numbers of the next generation SM-3 Block IIA weapons on their ships.

Anti-satellite

On February 14, 2008, U.S. officials announced plans to use a modified SM-3 missile launched from a group of three ships in the North Pacific to destroy the failed American satellite USA-193 at an altitude of 130 nautical miles (240 kilometers) shortly before atmospheric reentry. Officials publicly stated that the intention was to "reduce the danger to human beings" due to the release of toxic hydrazine fuel carried on board, but in secret dispatches, US officials indicated that the strike was, in fact, military in nature. A spokesperson stated that software associated with the SM-3 had been modified to enhance the chances of the missile's sensors recognizing that the satellite was its target, since the missile was not designed for ASAT operations.

On February 21, 2008 at 03:26 UTC, the  guided-missile cruiser  fired a single SM-3 missile, hit and successfully destroyed the satellite, with a closing velocity of about 22,783 mph (36,667 km/h) while the satellite was 247 kilometers (133 nautical miles) above the Pacific Ocean. ,  as well as other land, air, sea and space-based sensors were involved in the operation.

Japan
In December 2007, Japan conducted a successful test of an SM-3 block IA aboard  against a ballistic missile. This was the first time a JMSDF vessel was employed to launch the interceptor missile during a test of the Aegis Ballistic Missile Defense System. In previous tests the Japan Maritime Self-Defense Force had provided tracking and communications.

Following a failure review board, JFTM-3 occurred launching from JS Myōkō resulting in a successful intercept in October 2009. The U.S. Navy's Pacific Missile Range Facility on Kauai launched the ballistic missile target. The crew of Kirishima, operating off the coast of Kauai, detected and tracked the target before firing a SM-3 Block IA missile.

The Japanese Defense Ministry is considering allocating money in the fiscal 2015 state budget for research on introducing the ground-based SM-3. Japanese ballistic missile defense strategy involves ship-based SM-3s to intercept missiles in space, while land-based Patriot PAC-3 missiles shoot down missiles SM-3s fail to intercept. Due to concern that PAC-3s could not respond to massive numbers of missiles fired simultaneously, and that the Maritime Self-Defense Force needs Aegis destroyers for other missions, basing SM-3s on land would be able to intercept more missiles earlier. Ground-basing of the SM-3 is dubbed "Aegis Ashore." By October 2016, Japan was considering procuring either Aegis Ashore or THAAD to add a new missile defense layer.

On August 31, 2022, the Japan Ministry of Defense announced that JMSDF will operate two "Aegis system equipped ships" (イージス・システム搭載艦 in Japanese) to replace the earlier plan of Aegis Ashore installations, commissioning one by the end of fiscal year 2027, and the other by the end of FY2028. The budget for design and other related expenses are to be submitted in the form of “item requests”, without specific amounts, and the initial procurement of the lead items are expected to clear legislation by FY2023. Construction is to begin in the following year of FY2024. At 20,000 tons each, both vessels will be the largest surface combatant warships operated by the JMSDF, and according to Popular Mechanics, they will "arguably [be] the largest deployable surface warships in the world.".

On 16 November 2022, the guided-missile destroyer  fired an SM-3 Block IIA missile, successfully intercepting the target outside the atmosphere in the first launch of the missile from a Japanese warship. On 18 November 2022, the  likewise fired an SM-3 Block IB missile with a successful hit outside the atmosphere. Both test firings were conducted at the Pacific Missile Range Facility on Kauai Island, Hawaii, in cooperation with the U.S. Navy and U.S. Missile Defense Agency. This was the first time the two ships conducted SM-3 firings in the same time period, and the testes validated the ballistic missile defense capabilities of Japan’s newest s.

NATO host countries

Poland
On July 3, 2010, Poland and the United States signed an amended agreement for missile defense under whose terms land-based SM-3 systems would be installed in Poland at Redzikowo. This configuration was accepted as a tested and available alternative to missile interceptors that were proposed during the Bush administration but which are still under development. U.S. Secretary of State Hillary Clinton, present at the signing in Kraków along with Polish Foreign Minister Radoslaw Sikorski, stressed that the missile defense program was aimed at deterring threats from Iran, and posed no challenge to Russia. , Poland is scheduled to host "about 24 SM3 IIA interceptors" in 2018. This deployment is part of phase 3 of the European Phased Adaptive Approach (EPAA).

Romania
In 2010/2011 the US government announced plans to station land-based SM-3s (Block IB) in Romania at Deveselu starting in 2015, part of phase 2 of EPAA. There are some tentative plans to upgrade them to Block IIA interceptors around 2018 as well (EPAA phase 3). In March 2013, a US defense official was quoted saying "The Romanian cycle will start out in 2015 with the SM-3 IB; that system is in flight testing now and doing quite well. We are very confident it is on track and on budget, with very good test results. We are fully confident the missile we are co-developing with Japan, the SM-3 IIA, will have proved in flight testing, once we get to that phase. Assuming success in that flight testing, then we will have ready the option of upgrading the Romanian site to the SM-3 IIA, either all of the interceptor tubes or we'll have a mix. We have to make that decision. But both options will be there."

The SM-3 Block IIB (currently in development for EPAA phase 4) was considered for deployment to Romania as well (around 2022), but a GAO report released Feb. 11, 2013 found that "SM-3 Block 2B interceptors launched from Romania would have difficulty engaging Iranian ICBMs launched at the United States because it lacks the range. Turkey is a better option, but only if the interceptors can be launched within 100 miles of the launch site and early enough to hit targets in their boost phase, an engagement scenario that presents a whole new set of challenges. The best basing option is in the North Sea, but making the SM-3 Block 2B ship compatible could add significantly to its cost". The troubles of the Block IIB program however do not affect the planned Block IB deployments in Romania.

Operators

Current operators
 
  — Ordered in October 2018.

Potential operators
  is planning to buy SM-3 missiles for their  frigates as part of the Defensienota 2022 (Strategic Plan 2022) to supplement the BMD sensor capabilities.
  is considering the SM-3s for its upcoming TF-2000 frigate program. Instead of Aegis guidance, Turkey plans on integrating a more advanced version of HAVELSAN's Genesis architecture and a phased array radar built by ASELSAN. Genesis is currently jointly offered with Raytheon as a C4ISR upgrade for s around the world.
  is considering to have SM-3 missiles on their two new frigates to provide shooter capabilities within the NATO BMD. Belgium and the Netherlands are buying 4 new frigates (2 frigates per country).

Gallery

See also
 ArcLight, DARPA's program on developing ground attack missile based on SM-3's booster
 Arrow 3, Israel's home-grown alternative
 THAAD, US Army's solution
 RIM-174 Standard ERAM, (SM-6)

References

External links

Pros and Cons of Missile Shield in Romania 2010
U.S. Navy Fact File: Standard Missile 
Designation-systems – RIM-161 Standard SM-3
GlobalSecurity.org – RIM-161 Standard SM-3
Astronautix.com – Raytheon RIM-161 Standard SM-3
Obama Shifts Gears on Missile Defense, by Cole Harvey, armscontrol.org, October 2009.

RIM161
Anti-satellite missiles
RIM161
RIM161
RIM161
RIM161
Military equipment introduced in the 2010s